C.J. Strike Wildlife Management Area at  is an Idaho wildlife management area in Elmore and Owyhee counties southwest of Mountain Home. The Idaho Department of Fish and Game manages Idaho Power Company, U.S. Fish and Wildlife Service, and Bureau of Land Management lands surrounding C. J. Strike Reservoir on the Snake and Bruneau rivers. In 2005, Idaho Power assumed management of the  it owns near the C. J. Strike Dam.

Raptors are common in the WMA, which is near the Morley Nelson Snake River Birds of Prey National Conservation Area. During winter 30,000-90,000 ducks and 5,000-12,000 Canada geese can be found in the WMA.

References

Protected areas established in 1953
Protected areas of Elmore County, Idaho
Protected areas of Owyhee County, Idaho
Wildlife management areas of Idaho